Royal Alexandra may refer to:

Royal Alexandra Theatre, Toronto, Ontario
Royal Alexandra Hospital, the name of various facilities in the United Kingdom and Canada
Alexandra Bridge, (officially the "Royal Alexandra Interprovincial Bridge"), between Ottawa, Ontario, and Gatineau, Quebec
Royal Yacht Alexandra